= Tarsoly Alexander =

Hungarian ten-pin bowler

Tarsoly Alexander (Hungary)
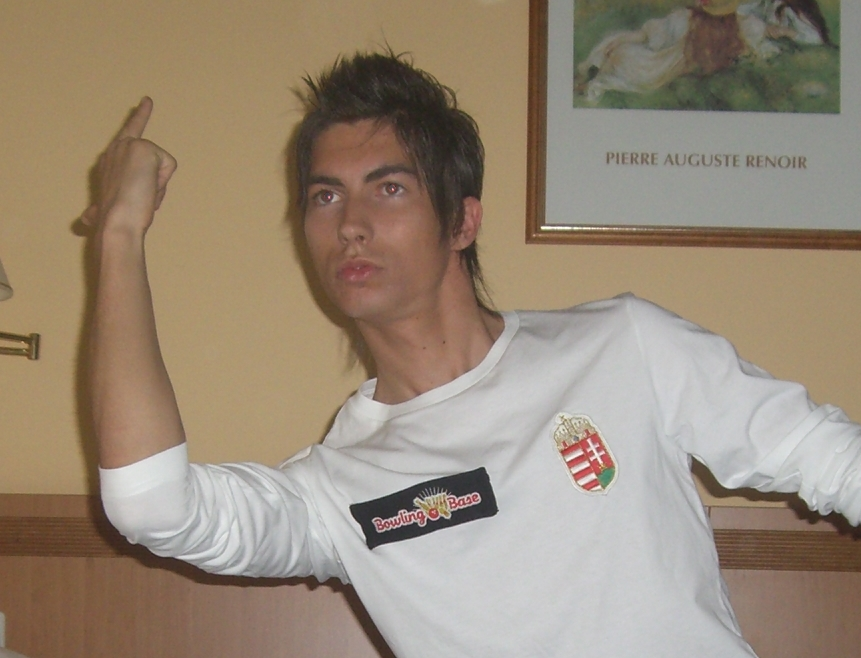
- Brunswick Euro Challenge 2013

Personal information
- Nationality: Hungarian
- Born: 4 December 1987 (age 37); Ingolstadt, Germany
- Height: 1.80 m (5 ft 11 in)

Tarsoly Alexander (born 4 December 1987 in Ingolstadt, Germany) is a Hungarian ten-pin bowler who was the Bavarian youth master 2001 and back to back Hungarian youth master in 2002, currently playing in the German bowling second national league 17/18.

== International competitions ==
#.	Competition.	Country.	Source.	Year.
1	European Youth Championships	Italy, Rome		2002
2	European Youth Championships	Netherlands, Schiedam		2003
3	European Youth Championships	Germany, Augsburg		2004
4	European Youth Championships	Belgium, Antwerp		2005
5	AMF World Cup	Shanghai, China		2016

== National competitions ==
#.	Competition	Style	Source	Rank	Year
1	Bavarian youth championships	Team		Silver	1999
2	Bavarian youth championships	Doubles		Silver	2000
3	Bavarian youth championships	Singles		Gold	2001
4	Bavarian youth championships	Doubles		Silver	2001
5	Bavarian youth championships	Team		Bronze	2001
6	(Hungary) Hungarian youth championships	Singles		Gold	2002
7	(Hungary) Hungarian youth championships	Singles		Gold	2002
8	(Hungary) Hungarian youth championships	Singles		Bronze	2003
9	Bavarian youth championships	Singles		Silver	2005
10	(Germany) German youth championships	Team		Bronze	2005
11	Bavarian youth championships	Singles		Silver	2007
